Michael Soosairaj (born 25 December 1994) is an Indian professional footballer who plays as a winger for Indian Super League club Odisha.

Career

Early career and Chennai City
Born in Eraviputhenthurai, Tamil Nadu, Soosairaj first moved to Chennai when he attended Madras Christian College. At the age of 10 he started training with his local football club/academy St. Catherine FC one of the oldest football clubs in the state. He represented the college in Inter-University tournaments before joining Arrows Football Club of the CFA Senior Division. After spending time with Arrows, Soosairaj joined another CFA Senior Division side, Chennai City. He also played for Tamil Nadu in the Santosh Trophy.

In December 2016, Chennai City FC were announced as a direct-entry side into the I-League, India's top-tier football league. He made his professional debut for the club on 4 December 2017 in Chennai City's second match of the 2017–18 season against Gokulam Kerala. Pandiyan started and played the whole match as Chennai City drew 1–1. On 17 January 2017, Soosairaj made his professional debut in the I-League for Chennai City against DSK Shivajians. He came on as a 61st-minute substitute for Malsawmfela despite Chennai City losing 2–0.

On 8 April 2018, Soosairaj scored his first professional goal in the league against Minerva Punjab. His 41st-minute goal was the first in a 2–0 victory. He then scored his second goal of the season a few weeks later on 22 April against Churchill Brothers. This time, Soosairaj scored Chennai City's only goal in the 54th minute as they lost 5–1. The next season, Soosairaj scored his first brace, scoring twice against Churchill Brothers on 17 February 2018. His two goals contributed to a 3–1 victory for Chennai City. He then scored his third goal of the season a couple weeks later on 2 March against Minerva Punjab. His 5th-minute goal was the first in a 2–1 victory for Chennai City.

After the 2017–18 season, Soosairaj was named the league's best midfielder by the All India Football Federation.

Jamshedpur
On 9 March 2018, it was announced that Soosairaj had signed for Jamshedpur of the Indian Super League. He scored 4 goals in 14 matches during the 2018–19 season. He was brilliant throughout the season playing as a left or right winger . He earned a lot of admiration   for his performance. He was one of the standout Indian players of the season, and his performances led to him gaining his first international call-up.

ATK
Before the start of the 2019–20 season, Indian Super League side ATK activated the release clause of Michael Soosairaj as  Soosairaj scored against Mumbai City FC this season, assisting ATK in a 2–0 win.

ATK Mohun Bagan
After the merger of ATK and Mohun Bagan, Soosairaj joined ATK Mohun Bagan, and was included in twenty-two men squad by manager Antonio Lopez Habas for the team's 2021 AFC Cup inter-zonal semifinal match against Uzbek side Nasaf.

Odisha
On 28 May 2022, the Juggernauts secured the signature of Soosairaj, on a two-year deal.

Personal life
His elder brother Michael Regin is also a professional footballer.

Career statistics

Club

International

Honours

India
 King's Cup third place: 2019

References

1994 births
Living people
Indian footballers
Footballers from Tamil Nadu
Chennai City FC players
Jamshedpur FC players
Association football midfielders
I-League players
ATK (football club) players
Indian Super League players
India international footballers
ATK Mohun Bagan FC players